Niclas Felix Düring (born April 6, 1990) is a Swedish sailor. He competed at the 2012 Summer Olympics in the 49er class. He currently pursues a M.Sc in Industrial Engineering and Management at Chalmers University of Technology in Gothenburg.

Düring was born in Sundbyberg, Sweden on April 6, 1990.

References

Swedish male sailors (sport)
Living people
Olympic sailors of Sweden
Sailors at the 2012 Summer Olympics – 49er
1990 births
People from Sundbyberg Municipality
Sportspeople from Stockholm County